The Kohinoor Business School is a lively institute located in the heart of Mumbai city very close to Mumbai’s main corporate hub – BandraKurla Complex (BKC) and has emerged as an effusively cohesive management institute of higher learning. The philosophy of Kohinoor Business School (KBS) is to “Bridge the Gap between Classroom Wisdom and Business Realities” and make students Industry oriented. Our mission is dedicated to creating responsible leaders of tomorrow through value based education and mentoring along with them having sound academic knowledge with networking skills.

Kohinoor Business School (KBS) offers Master of Management Studies (MMS) – Affiliated to University of Mumbai, approved by Director of Technical Education and All India Council of Technical Education (AICTE). The MMS program focuses on sculpting students into highly professional and capable business managers throwing them into the ring to react smartly to true-to-life situations using their wit, presence of mind, analytical skills and business acumen. This brings out their true potential and they emerge as tough professionals after going through rigor and relentless focused hard work.and offers the following two years full-time programs:

Courses
  Post Graduate Diploma in Management (PGDM) approved by AICTE.
 Master of Management Studies (MMS) - Affiliated to Mumbai University approved by DTE and AICTE.

References

External links

Business schools in India
Affiliates of the University of Mumbai
Educational institutions established in 2005
2005 establishments in Maharashtra